Horsey is a railway point and unincorporated place in geographic Templeton Township, Algoma District in Northeastern Ontario, Canada. The community is counted as part of Unorganized Algoma North Part in Canadian census data, and is located just south of the border with Cochrane District.

Horsey is on the Algoma Central Railway, between the communities of Boon to the south and Mead to the north, and has a passing loop.

References

Other map sources:

Communities in Algoma District